Elgin High School is a public high school in Elgin, Oregon, United States.

Academics
In 2008, 86% of the school's seniors received their high school diploma. Of 43 students, 37 graduated, three dropped out, and three returned for the fall semester in 2008.

References

High schools in Union County, Oregon
Public high schools in Oregon